Celtic punk is punk rock mixed with traditional Celtic music.

Celtic punk bands often play traditional Irish, Welsh or Scottish folk and political songs, as well as original compositions. Common themes in Celtic punk music include politics, Celtic culture and identity, heritage, religion, drinking and working class pride.

The genre was popularized in the 1980s by The Pogues.

The term Celtic punk is usually used to describe bands who base their music in Irish or Scottish traditional music. It is considered part of the broader folk punk genre, but that term tends to be used for bands that use English, American and other forms of folk music as inspiration.

The typical Celtic punk band includes rock instrumentation as well as traditional instruments such as bagpipes, fiddle, tin whistle, accordion, mandolin, and banjo. Like Celtic rock, Celtic punk is a form of Celtic fusion.

History
Celtic punk's origins date back to 1960s and 1970s folk rock musicians who played Irish folk music and Celtic rock in the UK, as well as in more traditional Celtic folk bands such as the Dubliners and the Clancy Brothers. The Scottish band the Skids were possibly the first UK punk band to add a strong folk music element, as they did on their 1981 album Joy. Around the same time in London, Shane MacGowan and Spider Stacy began experimenting with a sound that became the Pogues. Their early sets included a mixture of traditional folk songs and original songs written in a traditional style but performed in a punk style. Other early Celtic punk bands included Nyah Fearties, Australia's Roaring Jack and Norway's Greenland Whalefishers.

The 1990s gave rise to a Celtic punk movement in North America, centered around the likes of the Dropkick Murphys of Massachusetts,and Chicago's The Tossers both cities with particularly large population of Irish Americans,  as well as LA's Flogging Molly. North American Celtic punk bands have been influenced by American forms of music. These groups commonly sang in English.

See also
Celtic metal

Scottish Gaelic punk

References

External links
Shite'n'Onions
Paddy Rock
Irish Punk

 
British styles of music
Celtic music
Fusion music genres
Punk rock genres
British rock music genres